Terrence Albert Scales (born 18 January 1951) is an English retired professional football defender who made over 210 appearances in the Football League for Brentford.

Playing career

West Ham United 
Scales began his career in the youth system at First Division club West Ham United. He failed to make a first team appearance for the Hammers and departed Upton Park at the end of the 1970–71 season.

Brentford 
Scales dropped through the leagues to sign for Fourth Division club Brentford during the 1971 off-season. He had caught the eye of the Bees' staff while playing for West Ham United in Peter Gelson's testimonial match in November 1970 and was recommended to the club by former forward and Hammers coach Roger Cross. Scales went straight into the team and made 46 appearances during the 1971–72 season and helped Brentford to promotion to the Third Division. Despite another 44 appearances during the 1972–73 season, the club were relegated straight back to the Fourth Division. Adept anywhere across the back four and also in midfield, Scales was a regular pick until the 1976–77 season, when he made just 12 appearances. Scales departed the Bees in March 1977 and made 234 appearances and scored seven goals during his six years at Griffin Park.

Non-league football 
Scales dropped into non-league football and signed for Isthmian League Premier Division club Dagenham during the 1977 off-season. He later made over 350 appearances for Essex Senior League club Heybridge Swifts.

Personal life 
After his retirement from football, Scales worked as a driving instructor, clerk, office manager and labourer.

Honours 
Brentford
 Football League Fourth Division third-place promotion: 1971–72

Career statistics

References

1951 births
Footballers from Stratford, London
English footballers
Brentford F.C. players
English Football League players
West Ham United F.C. players
Dagenham F.C. players
Heybridge Swifts F.C. players
Isthmian League players
Association football defenders
Association football midfielders
Living people